The Olivet Comets football program represents Olivet College in college football at the NCAA Division III level.

References

External links
 

 
American football teams established in 1884
1884 establishments in Michigan